Górnik Zabrze, formerly known as Pogoń Zabrze, is a professional men's handball club based in Zabrze in southern Poland, competing in the Polish Superliga. Two–time Polish Champion and three–time Polish Cup winner.

Honours
 Polish Superliga
Winners (2): 1988–89, 1989–90
Runners-up (3): 1975–76, 1978–79, 1987–88

 Polish Cup
Winners (3): 1983–84, 1987–88, 1989–90

Team

Current squad
Squad for the 2022–23 season

Goalkeepers
1  Casper Liljestrand
 12  Paweł Kazimier 
 16  Piotr Wyszomirski
 50  Bartosz Szczepanik 
Left wingers
3  Dawid Molski
 15  Dmytro Artemenko
 44  Igor Bykowski
Right wingers
 21  Patryk Mauer
 22  Liubomyr Ivanytsia
Line players
 41  Sebastian Kaczor
 89  Adam Wąsowski
 90  Dmytro Ilchenko

Left backs
 10  Krzysztof Łyżwa
 95  Piotr Rutkowski
 98  Damian Przytuła
Centre backs
 11  Aliaksandr Bachko
 19  Paweł Krawczyk
 20  Wojciech Mrozek
Right backs
7  Rennosuke Tokuda
 31  Paweł Dudkowski

Transfers
Transfers for the 2022–23 season

 Joining
  Casper Liljestrand (GK) (from  Grupa Azoty Unia Tarnów)
  Piotr Wyszomirski (GK) (from  Grundfos Tatabánya)
  Aliaksandr Bachko (CB) (from  Azoty Puławy)
  Rennosuke Tokuda (RB) (from  TuS N-Lübbecke)
  Patryk Mauer (RW) (from  Gwardia Opole)
  Adam Wąsowski (P) (from  Sandra SPA Pogoń Szczecin)

 Leaving
  Martin Galia (GK) (to  HCB Karviná)
  Jakub Skrzyniarz (GK) (to  Bidasoa Irun)
  Michał Adamuszek (LB) (to  MUKS Zagłębie ZSO 14 Sosnowiec)
  Patryk Gregułowski (LB) (to  Stal Mielec)
  Łukasz Gogola (CB) (to  Sélestat AHB)
  Krystian Bondzior (RW) (to ?)
  Bartłomiej Bis (P) (to  HSC 2000 Coburg)

References

External links
 Official website 

Polish handball clubs
Sport in Silesian Voivodeship
Handball clubs established in 1947
1947 establishments in Poland
Zabrze